Sunlight Creek Bridge is a steel beam bridge in the Park County, Wyoming in the Shoshone National Forest and is the highest bridge in the state. It carries Chief Joseph Scenic Byway (Wyoming Highway 296) and pedestrian walkways on each side over the  Sunlight Gorge carved by Sunlight Creek. The bridge was built in 1985.

References

Bridges in Wyoming
Park County, Wyoming
Steel bridges
Steel bridges in the United States